South Lake High School may refer to:
South Lake High School (Florida)
South Lake High School (Michigan)
South Lake High School (Seattle)